Arc Angel may refer to:

 Arc Angel (band), an AOR rock band
 Arc Angel (album), an album by Arc Angel

See also
 Arc Angels, a Texas blues band
 Archangel